Earl of Linlithgow was a title in the Peerage of Scotland. It was created in 1600 for Alexander Livingston, 7th Lord Livingston, along with the subsidiary title of Lord Livingston and Callendar. In 1695, the Earldom of Linlithgow merged with the junior Earldom of Callendar, which had been created in 1641 for a younger son of the 1st Earl.

The 5th Earl of Linlithgow (and 4th Earl of Callendar) was attainted in 1716 for his participation in the Jacobite Rising of 1715, and all of his peerages were forfeited. The seat of the Earls of Linlithgow was Callendar House in Falkirk, which is now a museum.

Lords Livingston (1458–1716)
 James Livingston, 1st Lord Livingston (d. 1467) appointed Lord High Chamberlain of Scotland in 1448.
 James Livingston, 2nd Lord Livingston (d. 1497)
 James Livingston, 3rd Lord Livingston (d. 1503), nephew of the 2nd Lord
 William Livingston, 4th Lord Livingston (d. 1518), a lineal descendant was Robert Livingston the Elder of New York
 Alexander Livingston, 5th Lord Livingston (d. 1550) 
 William Livingston, 6th Lord Livingston (d. 1592)
 Alexander Livingston, 7th Lord Livingston (d. 1623), created Earl of Linlithgow in 1600

Earls of Linlithgow (1600–1716)
Alexander Livingston, 1st Earl of Linlithgow (d. 1623)
Alexander Livingston, 2nd Earl of Linlithgow (d. 1650)
George Livingston, 3rd Earl of Linlithgow (1616-1690)
George Livingston, 4th Earl of Linlithgow (d. 1695)
James Livingston, 5th Earl of Linlithgow, 4th Earl of Callendar (d. 1723), married Margaret Hay (d.1723), attainted in 1716
Children: Lord Livingston (d. 1715) and Anne Livingston (d. 1747), who married the 4th Earl of Kilmarnock (attainted/forfeited 1746), from whom are descended the Earls of Erroll

See also
 Livingston family
 Marquess of Linlithgow

References

External links
 Cracroft's Peerage page

Forfeited earldoms in the Peerage of Scotland
Noble titles created in 1600